OpenImageIO is an open source library for reading and writing images. Support for different image formats is realised through plugins. The project is distributed with a modified BSD license.

History 
Project OpenImageIO started as ImageIO - an API that was part of Gelato, the renderer software developed by nVidia. Work on ImageIO started in 2002. In the same year the specification of the API and its header files was released under BSD license. In 2007, when the project Gelato was stopped, the development of ImageIO also ceased. After this Larry Gritz started a new project - OpenImageIO.

In April 2009 OpenImageIO was accepted into the Google Summer of Code program with four student slots.

September 2009 marked the release of Cloudy with a Chance of Meatballs, the first full-length feature film in whose production OpenImageIO, alongside OpenShadingLanguage, has been used as the texturing engine.

Applications 
OpenImageIO library comes with a few applications that demonstrate its features:
 iconvert - converts image files from one format to another
 idiff - compare two images, print information on how much they differ
 iinfo - prints basic (width and height of the image and its color depth) or detailed (metadata) information about the given image
 igrep - searches images for matching metadata
 iv - a simple image viewer
 maketx - a mipmap generation tool

Supported formats 
As of January 2018 the library supports the following formats: OpenEXR, HDR/RGBE, TIFF, JPEG/JFIF, PNG, Truevision TGA, BMP, ICO, FITS as well as BMP, JPEG-2000, RMan Zfile, FITS, DDS, Softimage PIC, PNM, DPX, Cineon, IFF, Field3D, Ptex, Photoshop PSD, Wavefront RLA, SGI, WebP, GIF. In addition, video files are supported through FFmpeg and raw camera formats are supported through LibRaw.

See also 
 ImageMagick
 DevIL

References

External links 
 

Graphics libraries
C++ libraries
Software using the BSD license